Forest L. Reinhardt is an American economist, currently the John D. Black Professor at Harvard Business School.

References

Year of birth missing (living people)
Living people
Harvard Business School faculty
American economists
Harvard Business School alumni